Depuratives are herbs that are considered to have purifying and detoxifying effects.

Herbs that are considered depurative include lingonberry, ukshi, the four-leaf clover, Paris polyphylla, and some species of elderberry.

See also
Detoxification (alternative medicine)

References

Herbalism